Erzsébet Hanti (born 21 October 1964) is a Hungarian gymnast. She competed in six events at the 1980 Summer Olympics.

References

External links
 

1964 births
Living people
Hungarian female artistic gymnasts
Olympic gymnasts of Hungary
Gymnasts at the 1980 Summer Olympics
People from Kecskemét
Sportspeople from Bács-Kiskun County